Nothing to Declare is a 2010 Franco-Belgian comedy film, written and directed by Dany Boon.

Plot
On 1 January 1993, two customs officers, one Belgian and the other French, have to deal with closure of their small customs post situated in the middle of the small village of "Courquain" (French) or "Koorkin" (Belgian).

Both a hereditary Francophobe and an over-zealous Belgian customs officer, Ruben Vandevoorde is forced to join the first Franco-Belgian mobile squad. The first French volunteer for the squad is Mathias Ducatel, Vandervoorde's personal bête noire. He does this because he has fallen in love with Vandervoorde's sister Louise, and is afraid to unveil their love because of the trouble it will cause within her family.

Meanwhile, in an effort to raise money for the restaurant No Man's Land during the transition to the Schengen Agreement, Jacques and Irene are hired by a drug trafficker named Duval to pass along information concerning the mobile squad's checkpoints. Unfortunately, the information is rendered useless as Duval's accomplice Tiburce hilariously fails to avoid customs and ends up in jail.

In their pursuit of the drug trafficker, Vandevoorde and Ducatel become close, at first because the priest tells Vandevoorde that his hatred towards the French will lead him straight to hell. But soon, Vandevoorde really starts to think of Ducatel as a good friend until he finds out that Ducatel has been seeing his sister in secret for a year. At that point, he pulls out his gun and tries to shoot Ducatel but his sister stops him, because she loves him.

In the end, Vandevoorde accepts them as a couple but remains a xenophobe and the audience is left in the dark about whether the father, who is much more of a Francophobe, accepts them or not.

Cast
 Benoît Poelvoorde: Ruben Vandevoorde
 Dany Boon: Mathias Ducatel
 Karin Viard: Irène Janus
 François Damiens: Jacques Janus
 Julie Bernard: Louise Vandevoorde
 Eric Godon: Chief Willems
 Zinedine Soualem: Lucas Pozzi
 Bruno Lochet: Tiburce
 Nadège Beausson-Diagne: Nadia Bakari
 Philippe Magnan: Mercier
 Guy Lecluyse: Grégory Brioul
 Laurent Gamelon: Duval
 David Coudyser: the country driver
 Jérôme Commandeur: the French driver
 Bouli Lanners: Bruno Vanuxem
 Jean-Luc Couchard: Brother Vanuxem
 Olivier Gourmet: the priest from Chimay
 Bruno Moynot: the estate agent
 Jean-Paul Dermont: Father Vandevoorde
 Laurent Capelluto: the Russian
 Chritel Pedrinelli: Olivia Vandevoorde
 Joachim Ledeganck: Léopold Vandevoorde
 Sylviane Alliet: "No Man's Land" client

Production
In an interview with ClapVideo, Dany Boon says that he wrote this film because he wanted to create something as strong as Welcome to the Sticks (French title: Bienvenue chez les Ch'tis). He was inspired by the fact that "we're all a stranger to someone", and that "we all experience some futile rejection that lead us to do stupid things". He also took inspiration of his parents' relationship and transformed it into the love story between Mathias Ducatel and Louise Vandevoorde.

Reception

Box office
According to Pathé the film sold  tickets in the Nord-Pas-de-Calais on the opening night, the biggest film success in the region since Bienvenue chez les Ch'tis.

Critical response
One of the major themes of the movie is how the European Union's vision of Europe may be good in theory but in practice can be damaging to the local economy in the border regions.

Critical reception of this film has been generally mixed. AlloCiné has given the film 2.5 out of 5. Rotten Tomatoes lists two reviews from critics, one positive, one negative.

References

External links

 
 
 Official press kit 

2010 films
2010 comedy films
French comedy films
2010s French-language films
Films directed by Dany Boon
Films set in Belgium
Films set in France
Films shot in France
Belgian comedy films
Films set in 1993
French-language Belgian films
2010s French films